1993–94 Ukrainian First League was the third season of the Ukrainian First League which was won by Prykarpattia Ivano-Frankivsk. The season started on August 15, 1993, and its final round (40th) was played on July 3, 1994. In the last round Evis Mykolaiv (Shipbuilders) snatched the ticket to the Ukrainian Premier League from under the nose of Polihraftekhnika Oleksandriya (a point ahead of the Shipbuilders) by beating Naftovyk Okhtyrka 2:1 after allowing the first goal.

It is also worth of noting that the newly promoted club from Cherkasy was leading the league during the winter break and along with the Oleksandria club was the main contender for promotion. The second half of the season for Dnipro was terrible and they placed in the mid-table after the final round.

Promotion and relegation

Promoted teams
Two clubs promoted from the 1992–93 Ukrainian Second League.
 FC Dnipro Cherkasy – champion  (returning after one season)
 FC Khimik Zhytomyr – 2nd place  (returning after one season)

Relegated teams 
No clubs were relegated from the 1992-93 Ukrainian Top League:

Renamed teams
 FC Pryladyst Mukacheve was renamed to Karpaty Mukacheve 
 FC Avtomobilist Sumy was renamed to FC SBTS Sumy

Teams
In 1993-94 season, the Ukrainian First League consists of the following teams:

Stadiums 

The following stadiums are considered home grounds for the teams in the competition.

Final table

Top scorers
Statistics are taken from here.

See also
 Ukrainian Premier League 1993–94
 Ukrainian Second League 1993–94
 Ukrainian Cup 1993-94

References 

Ukrainian First League seasons
2
Ukra